George Winkler (1869 – 1962) was an American architect who practiced in Pennsylvania, Florida and Oklahoma from 1903 to 1953.

Background and career
Winkler was born in Donegal, Pennsylvania, in 1869 and was educated at Curry College in Pittsburgh, Pennsylvania, Cornell University and Columbia University.  He was a member of the following partnerships: Robinson & Winkler, Pittsburgh and Altoona, Pennsylvania (1903-1907); Winkler & McDonald, Tulsa, Oklahoma (1910-1916); Schumacher & Winkler, Tampa, Florida (1926-1930); and Winkler & Reid, Oklahoma City, Oklahoma (1930-1950). A number of his works are listed on the U.S. National Register of Historic Places.

Winkler's works include (with attribution):
 320 South Boston Building, 320 South Boston, Tulsa, Oklahoma (Winkler, George)
 Clinton-Hardy House, aka Lee Clinton Residence, 1322 S. Guthrie, Tulsa, Oklahoma (Winkler, George), NRHP-listed
 Gold Star Memorial Library (1946), Oklahoma City University, Oklahoma City, Oklahoma (Winkler & Reid)
 Holy Family Cathedral (1914), corner 8th and Boulder, Tulsa, Oklahoma (Winkler & MacDonald, and J. P. Curtin, Associated Architects)
 Mayo Building, 420 S. Main Street, Tulsa, Oklahoma (McDonald, Charles A. & G. Winkler; Koberling, Joseph and Brandborg, Lennart), NRHP-listed 
 Mayo Hotel  (1924), 115 W. 5th Street, Tulsa, Oklahoma (Winkler, George), NRHP-listed
 Oklahoma City Public Library (1950), Oklahoma City, Oklahoma (Winkler & Reid)
 Trinity Episcopal Church, Tulsa, Oklahoma

References

1869 births
1962 deaths
Cornell University alumni
Architects from Pennsylvania
Architects from Oklahoma
Architects from Oklahoma City
Architects from Florida
20th-century American architects